Kral TV is a music television channel in Turkey owned by Doğuş Group.

Kral TV was launched in August 1994 and became a member of the Doğuş Group in June 2008. Turkey's first music TV channel Kral TV, triggered the rise of other Turkish music channels and gave a different direction to Turkish music industry.

Kral TV broadcast Turkish music videos introduced by on-air hosts 24/7. As the first music channel in Turkey, Kral TV became a platform where both artists and fans found a central location for music news and promotion.

VJs 
 VJ Atakan Canbazlar (1st VJ on air in Turkey)
 VJ Ataberk
 VJ Bülent Çarıkçı
 VJ Defne Joy Foster
 VJ Şoray Uzun
 VJ Yeşim
 VJ Ece İncedursun
 VJ Funda Gurdag
 VJ Neslihan
 VJ Sibel
 VJ Mohamed
 VJ Adnan

External links

Kral TV at LyngSat Address

References

Music television channels
Television stations in Turkey
Television channels and stations established in 1994
Doğuş Group
Music organizations based in Turkey